Es navidad is the first EP by reason of holidays of the duet of contemporary Christian music Tercer Cielo. The EP was premiered on 25 November 2008 under label Kasa Productions/Arroyo and a year afterwards on 15 September 2009 it was published digitally on iTunes with the instrumental tracks of each included song.

Background, production and content 
After 2 years with the groups new lineup, and seeing that Tercer Cielo was considered one of the best exponents of Christian music in Spanish, the group decided to go back to work on something new and in a more mature style for the Holiday season. Released by record label "Kasa Productions", close to the end of November 2008, Tercer Cielo's first Extend Play is titled "Es navidad", with 4 own songs written by Juan Carlos Rodríguez and two songs of other international authors: "María, ¿sabías qué?" by the composers Mark Lowry and Buddy Greene, and the song "Venid y adoremos"  authored by Darrell Crowther. This album is also the group's first and only production of Christmas songs. It marks a departure from previous material in the use of electronic rhythms and acoustic sound effects. Tercer Cielo did not want end 2008 without launching the disk although the majority of the year was spent promoting their previous disk Hollywood which carried them by 15 nations in the tour to promote the disk. The songs "Yo amo la navidad" (I love Christmas) and "Éste es mi año" (This is my year) written by Juan Carlos Rodríguez are full of joy and celebration, with electronic rhythms and acoustic sounds, and "Para niños como yo" (For children like me) interpreted only by Evely, puts on display the raw truth of the poor boys and how they feel during the holiday festivities. Evelyn and Juan Carlos indicated that they recorded the vocals for the songs during their trips, in hotels, using portable recording equipment whereas other musicians recorded their instrumental parts in other cities via Internet.

Track listing

References 

2008 EPs
Spanish-language EPs
Tercer Cielo EPs